Bahram I (also spelled Wahram I or  Warahran I) was the fourth Sasanian King of Kings of Iran from 271 to 274. He was the eldest son of Shapur I and succeeded his brother Hormizd I, who had reigned for a year.

Bahram I's reign marked the end of the Sasanian tolerance towards Manichaeism, and in 274, with the support of the influential Zoroastrian priest Kartir, he had Mani imprisoned and executed. Bahram I's reign was largely uneventful. He was succeeded by his son Bahram II.

Name 
The theophoric name "Bahram" is the New Persian form of the Middle Persian Warahrān (also spelled Wahrām), which is derived from the Old Iranian Vṛθragna. The Avestan equivalent was Verethragna, the name of the old Iranian god of victory, whilst the Parthian version was *Warθagn. The name is transliterated in Greek as Baranes, whilst the Armenian transliteration is Vahagn/Vrām. The name is attested in Georgian as Baram and Latin as Vararanes.

Life prior to his accession

Bahram I was the oldest son of Shapur I, the second shah of the Sasanian Empire. He had three younger brothers: Hormizd-Ardashir, Narseh, and Shapur Meshanshah. Although the oldest of Shapur's sons, Bahram I was ranked below his brothers, probably due to his mother's lowly origin: she was either a minor queen or a concubine. During Shapur's reign, Bahram I served as the governor of the newly conquered region of Gilan, situated on the southwest shore of the Caspian Sea. He held the title of Gelan Shah ("king of Gilan"). He is mentioned in an inscription on the wall of the Ka'ba-ye Zartosht at Naqsh-e Rostam near Persepolis in southern Iran, which Shapur I had created in order to praise his sons by citing their names and titles.

Shapur I died in 270, and was succeeded by Hormizd-Ardashir (who became known as Hormizd I), who ruled from May 270 until his death in June 271. Bahram I, who was never considered a candidate for succession of the throne by his father, ascended with the aid of the powerful Zoroastrian priest Kartir. He then made a settlement with Narseh, who agreed to give up his entitlement to the throne in return for the governorship of the important frontier province of Armenia, which was constantly the source of war between the Roman and Sasanian Empires. It is nevertheless likely that despite this settlement, Narseh still viewed Bahram as a usurper.

Reign 

The previous Sasanian shahs, including Shapur I, had pursued a policy of religious tolerance towards the non-Zoroastrian minorities in the empire. Although admiring the teachings of his own religion and encouraging the Zoroastrian clergy, Shapur I allowed the Jews, Christians, Buddhists, and Hindus to freely practice their own religions. He was also friendly towards Mani, the founder of Manichaeism, who was allowed to preach freely and even act as an escort in Shapur's military expeditions. Following Bahram I's accession to the throne, the rise of the authority of the Zoroastrian priesthood, and the increasing influence of Kartir, this changed. When Mani arrived at the city of Gundishapur there was uproar, in the same fashion as Jesus' entry into Jerusalem. After protests from Kartir and the other Zoroastrian priests, Bahram I was persuaded to imprison Mani, who was sentenced to death in 274.

Mani's death was followed by the persecution of his followers by Kartir and the Zoroastrian clergy, who moved against the kingdom's religious minorities as a way to increase and spread their influence. To the Zoroastrian clergy, Mani had been seen as a heterogeneous philosopher and a threatening pagan, who presented an obscure perception of Zoroastrianism that was tainted by Jewish, Buddhist, and Christian ideas. With the backing of Bahram I, Kartir laid the foundations for a Zoroastrian state church, which led to Bahram being applauded in Sasanian-based sources as a "benevolent and worthy king". Bahram I was nevertheless, like his predecessors, a "lukewarm Zoroastrian".

Bahram I died in September 274 and was succeeded by his son Bahram II. Another son of Bahram I, Hormizd I Kushanshah, ruled over the Kushano-Sasanian kingdom in the east, and would later lead a rebellion against Bahram II, which failed. The line of Bahram I continued to rule the Sasanian Empire until 293, when Narseh overthrew the latter's grandson Bahram III and proclaimed himself the new shah. The line was thus shifted to Narseh and his descendants, who continued to rule the empire until its fall in 651.

Coinage, appearance and habits 
Under Bahram I, the reverse of coins were changed back to the version minted during the reign of Shapur I, with two attendants turning their backs to the fire altar, instead of facing it. The front of Bahram I's coins shows him wearing the distinctive crown of the angelic divinity Mithra; a headgear decorated with ray-shaped spikes. A coin of Bahram was seemingly minted at Balkh in Bactria, which makes it the first imperial Sasanian coin (i.e. not Kushano-Sasanian) minted in the former domains of the Kushan Empire, and confirms direct Sasanian rule in the region under Bahram I. The lost Book of the Portraits of Sasanian Kings portrayed Bahram I as "standing, holding a lance in the right hand and leaning upon a sword held in the left, and wearing a red gown and trousers and a gold crown topped with a sky-blue globe".

Bahram I was keen on combat, hunting and feasting, which he regarded as righteousness.

Rock relief 

Following the precedent of Ardashir I and Shapur I, Bahram I had an image of his accession carved in a rock relief. It displayed him on horseback, accepting the diadem of kingship from the Zoroastrian supreme god Ahura Mazda, who is also depicted sitting on a horse. A Middle Persian inscription is written on the relief. According to the archaeologist Erich Schmidt, the relief is "artistically the most appealing example of Sasanian rock sculpture". When Narseh ascended the throne in 293, he had the rock relief altered, replacing Bahram's name with his own.

Notes

References

Sources 
 
 
 
  (2 volumes)

Further reading
  (40 volumes)

274 deaths
3rd-century births
3rd-century Sasanian monarchs
Shahnameh characters